WLGH is a non-commercial, contemporary Christian FM radio station located in Lansing, Michigan.  The station, which broadcasts on 88.1 MHz FM, is owned by Superior Communications (aka Michigan Community Radio and Northland Community Broadcasters). Edward Czelada is the CEO.

The station is officially licensed to operate in Leroy Township, which is just east of Lansing.  Its studios and transmitter are in Williamston.  WLGH began broadcasting in December 1996 as "The Light".  In June 2004 it "married" its sister station, "Joy FM", in a ceremony at Oldsmobile Park in Lansing.  The new network became known as Smile FM with WLGH as the flagship station.  All programming for the 13 stations in the Smile FM network originates at WLGH.

The station originally broadcast with 2.5 kW from 328 ft (100 m), but increased its power to 6.7 kW from a 571 ft (174 m) tower in 2006.  This improved coverage, especially to the north and south of Lansing.

Translators
W242BH began rebroadcasting WLGH in January 2018 to improve reception in the Marshall/Battle Creek area.

References

Michiguide.com - WLGH History

External links

Contemporary Christian radio stations in the United States
LGH
Radio stations established in 1996
LGH